Microvelia pulchella is a species of smaller water strider in the family Veliidae. It is found in the New World.

References

Further reading

 

Veliidae
Articles created by Qbugbot
Insects described in 1834